S/2006 S 3 is a natural satellite of Saturn. Its discovery was announced by Scott S. Sheppard, David C. Jewitt, Jan Kleyna, and Brian G. Marsden on June 26, 2006 from observations taken between January and April 2006.

S/2006 S 3 is about 6 kilometres in diameter, and orbits Saturn at an average distance of 21,308,400 km in 1160.7 days, at an inclination of 152.8° to the ecliptic, in a retrograde direction and with an eccentricity of 0.4707.

The moon was once considered lost in 2006 as it was not seen since its discovery. The moon was later recovered and announced in October 2019.

References
 Institute for Astronomy Saturn Satellite Data
 MPEC 2006-M45: Eight New Satellites of Saturn June 26, 2006 (discovery and ephemeris)

Norse group
Moons of Saturn
Irregular satellites
Discoveries by Scott S. Sheppard
Astronomical objects discovered in 2006
Moons with a retrograde orbit